Azalea Place is the second solo album by Joey Tempest, the vocalist in the Swedish hard rock band Europe. It was released on 25 April 1997.

"After my first solo album I went out to the States to work with Richard Dodd - who's this English guy living out in Nashville – on the second one, which kept me away from home for a long time," Tempest said in an interview, "But it was something that I needed to do, I had to get it out of my system."

Track listing
 "The Match" – 3:53 (Joey Tempest, Chris Difford)
 "If I'd Only Known" – 3:54 (Joey Tempest, Steve Diamond, Richard Dodd)
 "The One in the Glass" – 3:20 (Joey Tempest, Janet Zuckerman)
 "Dance for You" – 3:12 (Joey Tempest)
 "Not Welcome Any More" – 3:53 (Joey Tempest)
 "Losing You Again" – 4:21 (Joey Tempest, Kent Lavoie)
 "Revolution of Love" – 4:08 (Joey Tempest)
 "Better Than Real" – 3:31 (Joey Tempest)
 "If We Stay Or If We Go" – 4:02 (Joey Tempest, Will Jennings)
 "In Confidence" – 4:27 (Joey Tempest)
 "Further from the Truth" – 4:01 (Joey Tempest, Kent Lavoie)
 "Lucky" – 4:29 (Joey Tempest)

Personnel
Joey Tempest – Lead vocals, guitars, bass
Siobhan Maher – Spanish vocals on "Revolution of Love"
Reggie Young, Staffan Astner – Guitars
Tony Harrell – Keyboards
Greg Morrow, Tom Harding, Craig Crampf, Brian Barnett – Drums

Album credits 
Richard Dodd - Producer, engineer, arrangements
Jack Grochmal - Engineer
James Baur - Assisting engineer
Dan Leffler - Engineer on "If I'd Only Known"
Joey Tempest - Arrangements
George Marino - Mastering
Staffan Astner - Additional arrangements
Kristin Wilkinson - Strings arrangements
Martina Hoogland Ivanow - Photography
Martin Renck - Cover design

References 

Joey Tempest albums
1997 albums